Émile Kets (8 December 1923 – 20 July 2012) was a Belgian basketball player. He competed in the men's tournament at the 1948 Summer Olympics.

References

External links
 

1923 births
2012 deaths
Belgian men's basketball players
Olympic basketball players of Belgium
Basketball players at the 1948 Summer Olympics
People from Geraardsbergen
Sportspeople from East Flanders